V1094 Scorpii is a young stellar object in the constellation of Scorpius, located in the young Lupus Star Forming Region.

Planetary system

Periodic radial velocity variations in the young star V1094 Scorpii had at first been explained by the presence of a substellar object in a tight orbit. Currently, the presence of a substellar object has been retracted, invoking starspots as the actual cause for observed radial velocity variations.

References

K-type main-sequence stars
Circumstellar disks
T Tauri stars
Hypothetical planetary systems

Lupus (constellation)
Scorpii, V1094
J16083617-3923024